Victor Popa (15 April 1949 – 15 November 2020) was a Moldovan politician.

Career
He was a member of the Parliament of Moldova from 2010 until 2013, when he was named a Justice of the Constitutional Court of the Republic of Moldova.

References

External links 
 Popa Victor
 Site-ul Partidului Liberal
 Canal multimedia PL pe YouTube
 Parlamentul Virtual

1949 births
2020 deaths
People from Ungheni District
Liberal Party (Moldova) MPs
Moldovan MPs 2009–2010
Moldovan MPs 2010–2014
Constitutional Court of Moldova judges